Nejc Naraločnik (born January 5, 1999) is an alpine skier who competes for Slovenia. He competed for Slovenia at the 2022 Winter Olympics in the downhill, Super-G, and combined.

References

Living people
Olympic alpine skiers of Slovenia
Slovenian male alpine skiers
1999 births
Alpine skiers at the 2022 Winter Olympics
Sportspeople from Slovenj Gradec
Alpine skiers at the 2016 Winter Youth Olympics